A pulse wave or pulse train is a type of non-sinusoidal waveform that includes square waves (duty cycle of 50%) and similarly periodic but asymmetrical waves (duty cycles other than 50%). It is a term used in synthesizer programming, and is a typical waveform available on many synthesizers. The exact shape of the wave is determined by the duty cycle or pulse width of the oscillator output. In many synthesizers, the duty cycle can be modulated (pulse-width modulation) for a more dynamic timbre.
The pulse wave is also known as the rectangular wave, the periodic version of the rectangular function.

The average level of a rectangular wave is also given by the duty cycle, therefore by varying the on and off periods and then averaging these said periods, it is possible to represent any value between the two limiting levels. This is the basis of pulse-width modulation.

Frequency-domain representation
The Fourier series expansion for a rectangular pulse wave with period , amplitude  and pulse length  is

where .

Equivalently, if duty cycle  is used, and :

Note that, for symmetry, the starting time in this expansion is halfway through the first pulse.

Alternatively,  can be written using the Sinc function, using the definition , as 
 

Generation
A pulse wave can be created by subtracting a sawtooth wave from a phase-shifted version of itself. If the sawtooth waves are bandlimited, the resulting pulse wave is bandlimited, too. A single ramp wave (sawtooth or triangle) applied to an input of a comparator produces a pulse wave that is not bandlimited. A voltage applied to the other input of the comparator determines the pulse width.

Applications
The harmonic spectrum of a pulse wave is determined by the duty cycle. Acoustically, the rectangular wave has been described variously as having a narrow/thin, nasal/buzzy/biting, clear, resonant, rich, round and bright sound. Pulse waves are used in many Steve Winwood songs, such as "While You See a Chance".

In digital electronics, a digital signal is a pulse train (a pulse amplitude modulated signal), a sequence of fixed-width square wave electrical pulses or light pulses, each occupying one of two discrete levels of amplitude. These electronic pulse trains are typically generated by metal–oxide–semiconductor field-effect transistor (MOSFET) devices due to their rapid on–off electronic switching behavior, in contrast to BJT transistors which slowly generate signals more closely resembling sine waves.

See also
Gibbs phenomenon
Pulse shaping
Sinc function
Sine wave

References

Waves